The post of Archbishop of Wales was created in 1920 when the Church in Wales was separated from the Church of England and disestablished. The four historic Welsh dioceses had previously formed part of the Province of Canterbury, and so came under its Archbishop. The new Church became the Welsh province of the Anglican Communion.

Unlike the Archbishops of Canterbury and York, who are appointed by the King upon the advice of the Prime Minister, the Archbishop of Wales is one of the six diocesan bishops of Wales, elected to hold this office in addition to their own diocese.

With the establishment of the new province, there was debate as to whether a specific see should be made the primatial see, or if another solution should be adopted. Precedents were sought in the early history of Christianity in Wales, with St David's having a debatable pre-eminence among the sees. A Roman Catholic Archbishopric of Cardiff had been created in 1916. Instead, it was decided that one of the diocesan bishops should hold the title Archbishop of Wales in addition to their own see. The circulating character of the post was justified by Welsh geography and by the ecclesiastical precedent of the province of Numidia (of which St Augustine of Hippo had been a bishop).
The Archbishop is chosen in Llandrindod Wells, being a central point in the country. The first Archbishop was chosen in the Old Parish Church in Llandrindod, but in more recent years, Holy Trinity Church has been used.

Successive archbishops have not only represented different geographical areas but also different tendencies within Anglicanism. In the mid-twentieth century linguistic issues were prominent in the successive incumbencies of Edwin Morris (who spoke no Welsh) and of Glyn Simon (who sympathised with advocates of the use of the Welsh language). Morris in some ways represented the broad churchmanship characteristic of the first occupant of the newly created post, A. G. Edwards, whereas Simon in many respects inherited the Anglo-Catholic outlook of the second archbishop, Charles Green (but without his authoritarianism). Towards the end of his period in office Gwilym Williams was one of three leading Welsh figures in a deputation to guarantee the status of the language which had been challenged by Margaret Thatcher. He was also decisive in the decision to ordain women priests. The former archbishop of Canterbury, Rowan Williams, subsequently Master of Magdalene College, Cambridge, was Archbishop of Wales and Bishop of Monmouth.

Williams was succeeded by Barry Morgan, who signed 'Barry Cambrensis'. Morgan oversaw the first consecration of a female bishop in the province, and was noted for his radicalism in other fields including same sex marriage and his willingness to pronounce on political issues, including devolution, immigration, and organ donation. At the time of his retirement in 2017, he was the senior archbishop in the Anglican Communion by length of service.

The next archbishop was John Davies, who had been the senior bishop in the Church in Wales, and was elected on 6 September 2017 after acting as archbishop following Morgan's retirement. He was the first Bishop of Swansea and Brecon to hold the post of archbishop. He retired both as Bishop of Swansea and Brecon and as archbishop on 2 May 2021. 

On 6 December 2021, Andy John, Bishop of Bangor, was elected to serve as Archbishop of Wales by an Electoral College of the Church in Wales meeting at Holy Trinity Church, Llandrindod Wells; his election was confirmed (and therefore he legally took up the archiepiscopal See) immediately.

Edwards, the first archbishop, Bishop of St Asaph, was supported in the diocese of St Asaph by the sole Bishop of Maenan; Glyn Simon and Barry Morgan were supported by Assistant Bishops of Llandaff. Andy John, Archbishop from 2021, appointed Mary Stallard to be Assistant Bishop of Bangor.

List of Archbishops of Wales

References

Church in Wales
 
Wales